Affine gauge theory is classical gauge theory where gauge fields are affine connections on the tangent bundle over a smooth manifold . For instance, these are gauge theory of dislocations in continuous media when , the generalization of metric-affine gravitation theory when  is a world manifold and, in particular, gauge theory of the fifth force.

Affine tangent bundle

Being a vector bundle, the tangent bundle  of an -dimensional manifold  admits a natural structure of an affine bundle , called the affine tangent bundle, possessing bundle atlases with affine transition functions.

The tangent bundle  is associated to a principal linear frame bundle , whose structure group is a general linear group .

Given linear bundle coordinates

 

on the tangent bundle , the affine tangent bundle can be provided with affine bundle coordinates

 

and, in particular, with the linear coordinates (1).

Affine gauge fields

The affine tangent bundle  admits an affine connection  which is associated to a principal connection on an affine frame bundle . In affine gauge theory, it is treated as an affine gauge field.

 

This affine connection defines a unique linear connection

 

 

relative to the affine coordinates (2).

 

of the extended linear connection  and a basic soldering form

 

Relative to the linear coordinates (1), the sum (5) is brought into a sum 
of a linear connection  and the soldering form  (6). In this case, the soldering form  (6) often is treated as a translation gauge field, though it is not a connection.

Let us note that a true translation gauge field (i.e., an affine connection which yields a flat linear connection on ) is well defined only on a parallelizable manifold .

Gauge theory of dislocations

In field theory, one meets a problem of physical interpretation of translation gauge fields because there are no fields subject to gauge translations .

In this case, let , and let an affine connection take a form

 

with respect to the affine bundle coordinates (2). This is a translation gauge field whose coefficients  describe plastic distortion, covariant derivatives  coincide with elastic distortion, and a strength  is a dislocation density.

Equations of gauge theory of dislocations are derived from a gauge invariant Lagrangian density

 

These equations however are not independent since a displacement field  can be removed by gauge translations and, thereby, it fails to be a dynamic variable.

Gauge theory of the fifth force

As was mentioned above, the soldering form  (6) often is treated as a translation gauge field, though it is not a connection. On another side, one mistakenly identifies  with a tetrad field. However, these are different mathematical object because a soldering form is a section of the tensor bundle , whereas a tetrad field is a local section of a Lorentz reduced subbundle of a frame bundle .

In the spirit of the above-mentioned gauge theory of dislocations, it has been suggested that a soldering field  can describe sui generi deformations of a world manifold  which are given by a bundle morphism

 

where  is a tautological one-form.

Then one considers metric-affine gravitation theory  on a deformed world manifold as that with a deformed pseudo-Riemannian metric  when a Lagrangian of a soldering field  takes a form

 ,

where  is the Levi-Civita symbol, and

 

is the torsion  of a linear connection  with respect to a soldering form .
 
In particular, let us consider this gauge model in the case of small gravitational and soldering fields whose matter source is a point mass. Then one comes to a modified Newtonian potential of the fifth force type.

See also
 Connection (affine bundle)
 Dislocations
 Fifth force
 Gauge gravitation theory
 Metric-affine gravitation theory
Classical unified field theories

References
 A. Kadic, D. Edelen, A Gauge Theory of Dislocations and Disclinations, Lecture Notes in Physics 174  (Springer, New York, 1983), 
 G. Sardanashvily, O. Zakharov, Gauge Gravitation Theory (World Scientific, Singapore, 1992), 
 C. Malyshev, The dislocation stress functions from the double curl T(3)-gauge equations: Linearity and look beyond, Annals of Physics 286 (2000) 249.

External links
 G. Sardanashvily, Gravity as a Higgs field. III. Nongravitational deviations of gravitational field, .

Gauge theories
Theories of gravity